GBM may refer to:

Medicine
 Glioblastoma multiforme
 Glomerular basement membrane

Science and technology
 Gateway belief model, a model in psychology and the communication sciences
 Geometric Brownian motion, continuous stochastic process where the logarithm of a variable follows a Brownian movement, that is a Wiener process
 Gradient boosting, a machine learning technique
 Generic Buffer Management, a graphics API
 Gamma-ray Burst Monitor, aboard the Fermi Gamma-ray Space Telescope

Other uses 
 Grand Besançon Métropole, a French intercommunal structure
 GBM (League of Legends player) (born 1994), Korean video gamer
 Game Boy Micro, a 2005 handheld game console and the last model in the Game Boy line
 Garbaharey Airport, in Somalia
 Garhwali language
 Grand Bauhinia Medal, an honour of Hong Kong
 Greater Britain Movement, a short-lived far-right group
 Green Belt Movement, a Kenyan environmental organisation